Cha-231 or No. 231 (Japanese: 第二百三十一號驅潜特務艇) was a No.1-class auxiliary submarine chaser of the Imperial Japanese Navy that served during World War II.

History
She was laid down on 30 August 1944 at the Ishinomaki shipyard of Yamanishi Shipbuilding Co., Ltd. (株式會社山西造船鐵工所) and launched later in the same year. She was fitted with armaments at the Yokosuka Naval Arsenal; completed and commissioned on 7 December 1944; and assigned to the Sasebo Defense Force, Sasebo Naval District. Cha-231 survived the war. 

On 1 December 1945, she was demobilized and enrolled as a minesweeper by the occupation forces. On 1 January 1947, she was assigned to the Japan Maritime Safety Agency and on 20 August 1948 she was designated minesweeper MS-17. On 1 December 1951, she was renamed Shiratori (しらとり).  On 1 July 1954, she was transferred to the newly created Japan Maritime Self-Defense Force. She was delisted on 31 March 1962.

References

1944 ships
No.1-class auxiliary submarine chasers
Auxiliary ships of the Imperial Japanese Navy